John James Boland (30 November 1944 – 14 August 2000) was an Irish Fine Gael politician who served as Minister for Health from January 1987 to March 1987, Minister for the Environment from 1986 to 1987, Minister for the Public Service from 1982 to 1986 and Minister for Education from 1981 to 1982. He served as a Teachta Dála (TD) from 1977 to 1989. He also served as a Senator for the Labour Panel from 1969 to 1977.

Boland was born in Dublin in 1944. He was educated at Synge Street Christian Brothers School and University College Dublin, where he received a Bachelor of Commerce degree. Boland first became involved in politics in 1967, when he was elected to Dublin County Council. He served on that authority until 1981. Boland first ran for the Dáil Éireann at the 1969 general election, however, he was unsuccessful. He did secure election to Seanad Éireann on the Labour Panel, becoming the youngest ever Senator at the time. He was re-elected to the Seanad in 1973.

Boland was eventually elected to Dáil on his third attempt at the 1977 general election as a Fine Gael TD for the Dublin County North constituency. He retained his seat at each election until losing it at the 1989 general election. Boland was immediately appointed to the Opposition front bench as Spokesperson on Health. He later served as Spokesperson on the Environment. In 1981, Fine Gael formed a government with the Labour Party, with Boland becoming Minister for Education. He later served in a range of portfolios in Taoiseach Garret FitzGerald's second government, including Minister for the Public Service.

References

 

1944 births
2000 deaths
Fine Gael TDs
Members of the 12th Seanad
Members of the 13th Seanad
Members of the 21st Dáil
Members of the 22nd Dáil
Members of the 23rd Dáil
Members of the 24th Dáil
Members of the 25th Dáil
Ministers for Health (Ireland)
Politicians from County Dublin
Ministers for Education (Ireland)
Alumni of University College Dublin
Ministers for the Environment (Ireland)
Fine Gael senators
People educated at Synge Street CBS